Tenninkyō Onsen (天人峡温泉) is a geothermal hot spring village with a small onsen resort in the Daisetsuzan National Park, Hokkaidō, Japan. 

There are waterfalls nearby that attract a number of visitors, for example the 270 meter Hagoromo Waterfall (羽衣の滝, hagoromo no taki) and the Shikishima Waterfall (敷島の滝, shikishima no taki).  There are also a number of popular hiking courses nearby. A hiking trail head is located in the village that leads to the Hagoromo Falls, continuing further, hikers will reach another waterfall. There are many hiking trails in the National Park.

The onsen is located approximately one hour from the city of Asahikawa, and is accessible by car. Limited public transportation exists within the National Park. Nearby hot springs include Sounkyo Onsen and Ashidadake Onsen. Lodging is available in the area.

References

See also
 List of hot springs in Japan
 List of hot springs in the world

Tourist attractions in Hokkaido
Landforms of Hokkaido
Hot springs of Hokkaido
Springs of Japan